Chaetolopha decipiens is a species of moth of the family Geometridae. It is known from New South Wales.

The wingspan is about 20 mm. Adults have brown wings, with broad light and dark zigzag bands across each forewing. The hindwings are a uniform pale brown.

The larvae are thought to feed on Polypodiophyta species.

References

Moths described in 1886
Larentiinae
Moths of Australia